Leah Ashton is an Australian author of contemporary romance. In 2014, she received Romance Writers of America's RITA Award for Best Short Contemporary Series Romance for Why Resist a Rebel?.

Biography
Ashton lives in Perth, Western Australia and works as an IT Project Manager at a university.

Bibliography

Stand-alone works
 
 
 
 
 
 Out Run the Night. Leah Ashton. March 2020.  
 Defiant. Leah Ashton. April 2019.

Awards and reception

 2014 – Romance Writers of America RITA Award for Best Short Contemporary Series Romance for Why Resist a Rebel?
 2020 – Romance Writers of Australia Ruby Award for Romantic Suspense for Out Run the Night

References

External links 
 Author's Blog
 Author's Website

Living people
21st-century Australian novelists
Australian women novelists
Australian romantic fiction writers
RITA Award winners
Year of birth missing (living people)
21st-century Australian women writers
Women romantic fiction writers